The 2019 FIVB Women's Beach Volleyball Intercontinental Olympic Qualification Tournament was a volleyball tournament for women's beach volleyball players organised by Fédération Internationale de Volleyball (FIVB), held in September 2019. 16 teams played in the tournament, where the top 2 teams qualified to the 2020 Olympic volleyball tournament.

Qualification

Pools composition

First round
Teams were seeded following the Serpentine system according to their FIVB Beach Volleyball World Rankings as of 16 July 2019.

Second round

Third round

First round
All times are China Standard Time (UTC+08:00).

Pool A

Semifinals

|}

Final

|}

Standing

|}

Pool B

Semifinal

|}

Final

|}

Standing

|}

Pool C

Semifinal

|}

Final

|}

Standing

|}

Pool D

Semifinal

|}

Final

|}

Standing

|}

Second round
All times are China Standard Time (UTC+08:00).

Pool E

|}

|}

Pool F

|}

|}

Pool G

|}

|}

Pool H

|}

|}

Third round
All times are China Standard Time (UTC+08:00).

Pool I

|}

|}

Pool J

|}

|}

Final round
All times are China Standard Time (UTC+08:00).

Final 1

|}

Final 2

|}

See also 
2019 FIVB Men's Beach Volleyball Intercontinental Olympic Qualification Tournament

References

External links

Fédération Internationale de Volleyball – official website
Tokyo Volleyball Qualification – official website

Volleyball qualification for the 2020 Summer Olympics
2019 in  beach volleyball
FIVB Olympic Qualification Tournament Women